Lara Arruabarrena and María Teresa Torró Flor were the defending champions, but chose not to compete together. Arruabarrena played alongside Paula Cristina Gonçalves, but lost in the quarterfinals to María Irigoyen and Paula Kania. Torró Flor was scheduled to team up with Shahar Pe'er, but withdrew before their first round match.
Anabel Medina Garrigues and Arantxa Parra Santonja won the title, defeating Kiki Bertens and Johanna Larsson in the final, 6–0, 6–4.

Seeds

Draw

References
 Main Draw

2016 Abierto Mexicano Telcel